Piz Sesvenna is the highest mountain in the Sesvenna Range of the Alps. It lies between the Swiss canton of Graubünden and the Italian region of South Tyrol. The summit is located within Switzerland, very close to the Italian border and main watershed.

On the north side of Piz Sesvenna lies a glacier named Vadret da Sesvenna.

The closest locality is S-charl, south of Scuol in the Engadin valley.

See also
List of most isolated mountains of Switzerland

References

External links
 Piz Sesvenna on Summitpost
 Piz Sesvenna on Hikr

Mountains of Graubünden
Mountains of the Alps
Alpine three-thousanders
Mountains partially in Italy
Mountains of Switzerland